Trans World is a business simulation video game for the Commodore 64 published by Starbyte Software in 1990.

Gameplay
The player takes control of a new trucking company and competes against up to either three other human or computer players to make the most money. The game has two modes to choose from, a continuous play mode that plays indefinitely or a timed mode that runs a select number of turns. Players control all aspects of the company from purchasing new trucks to hiring mechanics to building new offices. Each round of the game controls one day of game time with each player taking a turn. Periodically, a random event will happen which can either help or hinder the player's company. Some events are offers to have goods delivered while others are sick days that skip the player's turn. The game ends when a player chooses to end it or when the selected number of rounds have been completed. The winner is the player with the most money at the game's end.

References

1990 video games
Business simulation games
Commodore 64 games
Commodore 64-only games
Single-player video games
Starbyte Software games
Vehicle simulation games
Video games developed in Germany
Video games scored by Jochen Hippel